Peggy O'Brien Ph.D. is the founding director of education at the Folger Shakespeare Library and an internationally recognized authority in the teaching of Shakespeare and literature.  She speaks and writes on teaching and learning with respect to Shakespeare and the humanities, and to K-12 classrooms.  She is a director of SAGE Publications, board chair of St. Coletta School in Washington, D.C. and past board chair at Trinity Washington University. She founded and directs the Folger Library's Teaching Shakespeare Institute, its Summer Academy for teachers and a number of other programs.  She is general editor of the Shakespeare Set Free series of books on the teaching of Shakespeare. O'Brien is a resident consulting teacher at the Brooklyn Academy of Music and launched and published Shakespeare Magazine. O'Brien has worked in the service of education since 1969. She has taught English in District of Columbia public high schools, held the senior education positions in both public broadcasting and the cable industry's education foundation, and served on the leadership team of DC Public Schools. She teaches at Georgetown University and Trinity Washington University.

Education and early career
O'Brien attended Trinity College in Washington, DC (now Trinity Washington University) and graduated with a Bachelor of Arts degree in 1969. The same year she began teaching high school English at public schools in Washington, D.C., where she continued teaching until 1975. In 1971, O'Brien graduated from The Catholic University of America with a Master of Arts degree. From 1973-1976 she served as the education coordinator of the Street Law Project at Georgetown University Law Center. She graduated with a Doctor of Philosophy degree from American University in 1993.

Career at the Folger Shakespeare Library
O'Brien began at the Folger Shakespeare Library in 1981, originally hired to run the Museum docent program. Noticing that the library's only education programs were aimed at graduate students, O'Brien established the Library's education mission and its commitment to elementary, middle, and high school students and their teachers. "Soon after, tribes of fourth- through twelfth-grade teachers and students began flowing through the Folger Library on a regular basis. Day-long workshops with actors and scholars for teachers. A special fellowship semester for 18 seniors from high schools all around the metropolitan DC area. Seventh through twelfth graders in the winter, and fourth through sixth graders in the spring, turned up for the student Shakespeare festivals."

O'Brien founded the Folger Shakespeare Library's education division, and started a full range of educational programs, including the Teaching Shakespeare Institute, funded by the National Endowment for the Humanities. She created a network of smaller institutes and workshops that serve teachers around the United States in their own classrooms as well as at the Folger, bringing teachers from all over the country to study together there with distinguished faculties of scholars, actors, and teachers assembled especially for this purpose.

Since her return to the Folger in 2013, the Library's education programs include expanded national programs (online master classes, the establishment of a National Teacher Corps, widely distributed educational materials on the First Folio) as well as local programs (a larger and stronger Library docent program, creation of curriculum and professional development for DC Public Schools).

Career in educational media and technology
O'Brien joined the Corporation for Public Broadcasting in 1994, and until 2000 served as vice president of education. She left in 2000 to become chief learning officer and chief operating officer of internet start-up company Knowledge In, Knowledge Out, Inc. (KIKO) in Long Beach, California from 2000-2001.  In 2001, O'Brien was recruited by the National Cable & Telecommunications Association as executive director of the National Cable and Telecommunications Education Foundation, where she served until 2004 when she returned to CPB as Senior Vice President Education.  In all these roles, she supported early and developing education technology projects in schools across the country. O'Brien worked with Masterpiece to produce Masterpiece Theatre's American Collection, a series of television adaptations of American novels, including The Song of the Lark by Willa Cather, Cora Unashamed by Langston Hughes, The Ponder Heart by Eudora Welty, A Death in the Family by James Agee, and Almost a Woman by Esmeralda Santiago. As the only teacher working at CPB, O'Brien had the notion to  bring together English teachers from all over the country to collaborate on ways to teach these films and making them accessible to students. She spearheaded a collaboration between the National Council of Teachers of English and CPB which resulted in the films premiering at the NCTE convention and a website featuring contributions from a national community of teachers.  She shaped and administered the successful Ready To Learn initiative, a collaboration between public broadcasting and the US Department of Education that resulted in the creation of content for television and other devices that helped underserved children learn to read.

Return to Washington, D.C. public schools
In 2008, she was recruited by Chancellor Michelle Rhee and served as chief of family and public engagement for District of Columbia Public Schools until 2011.

Board and advisory committee memberships
SAGE Publications, Inc., Thousand Oaks, CA,  Director, 2005–present, St. Coletta’s Public Charter School, Washington, DC,  Director, 2006-2008; 2011–present, Black Women’s Playwrighting Forum, Washington, DC,  Director, 1996–present, Association of American Colleges and Universities, Washington, DC, National Leadership Council,  2006–2010, Trinity University, Washington, DC, Chair, Board of Trustees, 2001-2008, National PTA, Chicago, IL,  Director, 2004-2007, Partnership for 21st Century Skills, Founding Board Member, 2001-2004, Edmund Burke School, Washington, DC, Director, 1995-2001, Capitol Hill Day School, Washington, DC, Director, 1992-1995

Keynotes and papers
World Teaching Shakespeare Conference, London, 2012 National Cathedral Scholars Commencement Speaker, 2012, Royal Shakespeare Company Student Festival, Ohio State University, 2012, Folger Library Teacher Institutes, NY and FL, 2011, National Council on Adolescent Literacy, 2009, Shakespeare Association of America Annual Conference, 2009, Folger Library, Shakespeare in American Education Conference, 2009, Portland State University, Portland, OR, Civic Engagement 2007, Phi Beta Kappa Induction, UNC Greensboro, “True Intellect”, 2006, Institute for Museum and Library Services Conference, 2005, Broadcasting and Cable Hall of Fame Dinner, NYC, 2004, National Council of Teachers of English Annual Conference, 2004, Association of American Colleges and Universities Conference, Baltimore, 2001, USC Annenberg School EC2 Incubator Conference, London, 2001, JFK Center for the Performing Arts, Washington, DC, “State of Arts Education”, 2000, Presidential Commission on Advocacy for Women and Minorities in Science, Engineering, and Technology, 1999, White House Conference on Internet Media for Children/Teens, 1998

Consultancies and residencesBrooklyn Academy of Music, NY, 1998-present, Folger Shakespeare Library, 1994-present, JFK Center for the Performing Arts, Washington, DC, 1994-present, Carnegie Hall, NY, 2009, Washington Post, Washington, DC, 2000-2005, Cambridge University Press, Cambridge UK, 1992-2002, Royal Shakespeare Company, Stratford and London, 1985-1995, PEN/Faulkner Foundation, 1985-2003.

Publications
“What’s Past: The founding head of education at the Folger Library on how it all got started,“ English Journal, September 2009Shakespeare Set Free Series, New York: Washington Square Press, creator and general editor, 1993-1995 (second editions, 2006)
“Technology is Vital for Strong Education,” Multichannel News, backpage, April 24, 2002
"Shakespeare Reborn," Humanities, Summer 1996
"'And Gladly Teach: Books, Articles, and a Bibliography on the Teaching of Shakespeare," Shakespeare Quarterly, Summer 1995

Awards and honorsShakespeare Steward Award, 2008Fillmore Arts Center, DC Public Schools, Arts Education Award, 1997Doctor of Laws honoris causa, Trinity College, May 1994The Public Humanities Award, D.C. Community Humanities Council, 1993Doctor of Humane Letters honoris causa'', Georgetown University, May 1991

References

English Journal, Vol. 99, No. 1, September 2009
http://www.linkedin.com/pub/dr-peggy-o-brien/2a/b10/b43
http://www.ncte.org/journals/ej/issues/v99-1
http://www.folger.edu/store/sd4/product/shakespeare-set-free-series-1382.cfm
http://connection.ebscohost.com/c/articles/6594557/technology-vital-strong-education
http://www.folger.edu/template.cfm?cid=1313
http://www.folger.edu/template.cfm?cid=604

Living people
American educators
Year of birth missing (living people)
Folger Shakespeare Library